Attilio Mattei (born 16 September 1902) was an Italian professional footballer who played as a defender.

He played for four seasons (47 games, no goals) in the Serie A for A.S. Roma.

His younger brothers Augusto Mattei and Aldo Mattei played football professionally. To distinguish them, Attilio was referred to as Mattei I, Augusto as Mattei II and Aldo as Mattei III.

External links
Profile at enciclopediagiallorossa.com 
Career statistics at almanaccogiallorosso.it 

1902 births
Year of death missing
Italian footballers
Serie A players
A.S. Roma players
L'Aquila Calcio 1927 players
Association football defenders